Adam Ross (born February 15, 1967) is an American writer and editor best known for his 2010 novel Mr. Peanut.

Biography 
Ross was born and raised in New York City. As a child actor, he appeared in the 1979 film The Seduction of Joe Tynan, as well as numerous television shows, commercials, and radio dramas. Ross attended the Trinity School, where he was a state champion wrestler. His early literary fixations included Frank Herbert's Dune and the comic books of John Byrne, Frank Miller, and Walt Simonson, which he loved "with such a passion that I read them into a state of frayed worthlessness."

After graduating from Vassar College in 1989, he received a Master of Arts at Hollins University and earned a 1994 Master of Fine Arts in creative writing at Washington University in St. Louis, where he was taught by Stanley Elkin and William H. Gass. In the late 1990s and early 2000s, Ross worked as a feature writer and reviewer for the alternative weekly Nashville Scene. He received a two-book deal from Alfred A. Knopf in 2007; his debut novel, Mr. Peanut, which Ross had been writing "on and off for 15 years," was published in 2010. A Hitchcockian true crime story about a video game designer whose wife is found dead with peanuts lodged in her throat, the novel is structured like a Möbius strip, forcing the reader to ascertain which events are real and which are guilty projections of its characters. Mr. Peanut was described by Michiko Kakutani in The New York Times as "a dark, dazzling and deeply flawed novel that announces the debut of an enormously talented writer," and was later named one of the best books of the year by The New Yorker, The Philadelphia Inquirer, The New Republic, and The Economist. It has been translated into 16 languages.

Ross's collection of short stories, Ladies and Gentlemen, was featured in Kirkus Reviews''' list of the best books of 2011. His nonfiction has appeared in The New York Times Book Review, The Daily Beast, and The Wall Street Journal. His forthcoming novel Playworld is a semiautobiographical account of a year in the life of a child actor; Ross has said that "the book’s about the sometimes-fraught space that arises when adults and children find themselves consistently private."

In 2016, Ross was appointed editor of the historic literary journal The Sewanee Review. Subscriptions have risen under his tenure, and The New York Times has credited him with "restor[ing] some of the journal's cultural cachet."

Ross lives in Nashville, Tennessee with his wife and their two daughters.

 Bibliography 
 Mr. Peanut (2010)
 Ladies and Gentlemen (2011)
 Playworld'' (forthcoming)

References

External links 
 Official website

Living people
1967 births
American male writers
21st-century American novelists
Washington University in St. Louis alumni
21st-century American male writers
Vassar College alumni
Hollins University alumni